Frank Coombs may refer to:
 Frank Coombs (politician) (1853–1934), United States representative from California
 Frank Coombs (American football), American football coach
 Frank Coombs (footballer) (1925–1998), professional footballer
 Frank Coombs (artist) (1906–1941), English painter, architect and art dealer